Dashti Qala District (دشت قلعه) is a district of Takhar Province, Afghanistan. It split from Khwaja Ghar District in June 2005. This district borders Tajikistan. Ai-Khanoum, probably founded by the Seleucid Empire, is located in this district. In 2018, this district was considered contested between the government and the Taliban.

Geography 
Dashti Qala District has an area of 270 square kilometers, comparatively equivalent to Niue. The Panj River borders the district, and the Kokcha River crosses Dashti Qala. The climate of the district is classified as cold, semi-arid steppe on the Köppen–Geiger climate classification system.

Location 
The district is surrounded by Darqad to the northwest, Khwaja Bahauddin to the north, Rustaq to the east, Khwaja Ghar to the south, and Khatlon province (Tajikistan) to the west. The Panj River forms the border between Khatlon Province and Dashti Qala.

Demographics 
Dashti Qala has a gender ratio of 103 males for every 100 females, matching the province. Dashti Qala has a young population, with an average age of 15.8 years.  84.3% of the population have never completed a class (which is 74.2% of males and 95% of females). 44.7% of Dashti Qala's population did not work prior to the United Nations Population Fund survey in 2015. Of that, 44.7%, 90% were unable to work. Dashti Qala has 31.5% of children under age 5. The average household size is 6.9 people.

Economy 
Wood is the main source of energy for heating and cooking. Most inhabitants use the sun for light. Dashti Qala receives 95.2% of its water from dug wells. 99.3% of houses are made of wood and dirt. Meanwhile, 24.6% of the households have an improved sanitation facility. About half of the houses have two rooms.

See also 
 Districts of Afghanistan
 Takhar Province

References

Districts of Takhar Province